Counter Admiral Rafig Asgarov was the Commander of the Azerbaijani Naval Forces since the restoration of the independence of Azerbaijan in 1991. Born in 1949 and appointed Commander of Azerbaijani Naval Forces in 1991, he was one of the few Azerbaijani admirals who served in high-ranking positions. He was replaced by Captain Fuad Yusifov.

See also
Azerbaijani Army
Ministers of Defense of Azerbaijan Republic
General Staff of Azerbaijani Armed Forces

References

Azerbaijani generals
Chiefs of General Staff of Azerbaijani Armed Forces
Azerbaijani Navy personnel
1949 births
Living people